Chandelier (シャンデリア) is the Japanese rock band Plastic Tree's sixth full-length album. Those who ordered the first press limited edition of this album also received a poster. Peaked at the 23rd position on Oricon Albums Chart.

Track listing

References

2006 albums
Plastic Tree albums